Halychany is a village in Lutsk Raion, Volyn Oblast, Ukraine, but was formerly administered within Horokhiv Raion. 

Villages in Lutsk Raion